The Capt. F. Deane Duff House is a historic site in Clewiston, Florida. It is located at 151 West Del Monte Avenue. On January 30, 1998, it was added to the U.S. National Register of Historic Places.

References

External links

 Hendry County listings at National Register of Historic Places
  at 

Houses on the National Register of Historic Places in Florida
Houses completed in 1936
Houses in Hendry County, Florida
National Register of Historic Places in Hendry County, Florida